Saccodon is a genus of scrapetooths found in the Tumbes-Chocó-Magdalena region from Panama to northwestern Peru.

Species
 Saccodon dariensis (Meek & Hildebrand, 1913)
 Saccodon terminalis (C. H. Eigenmann & Henn, 1914)
 Saccodon wagneri Kner, 1863

References
 

Parodontidae
Characiformes genera
Taxa named by Rudolf Kner